Joel Wicks (born 27 October 1994) is a former professional rugby league footballer who most recently played for the London Broncos in the Championship. He played as a hooker.

Wicks started as a junior for the Greenwich Admirals and was in the London Broncos Academy system.

In 2013 he made his Super League début for the Broncos against the Wakefield Trinity Wildcats.

In 2015 Wicks played nine games on loan at the London Skolars in League 1.

References

External links
Scoresway profile

1994 births
Living people
English rugby league players
London Broncos players
London Skolars players
Rugby league hookers
Rugby league players from London